The Archbishop of Dhaka is the head of the Roman Catholic Archdiocese of Dhaka, who is responsible for looking after its spiritual and administrative needs. As the archdiocese is the metropolitan see of the ecclesiastical province encompassing nearly all of the Dhaka Division, the Archbishop of Dhaka also administers the bishops who head the suffragan dioceses of Dinajpur, Mymensingh, Rajshahi and Sylhet. The current archbishop is Bejoy Nicephorus D'Cruze.

The archdiocese began as the Apostolic Vicariate of Eastern Bengal, which was created on February 12, 1850. Thomas Oliffe was appointed its first vicar. On September 1, 1886, the vicariate was elevated to the status of diocese by Pope Leo XIII. It was renamed as the Diocese of Dacca after its see in 1887. Augustin Louage was appointed its first bishop. On account of the population increase, the Holy See decided to elevate the diocese to the status of archdiocese on July 15, 1950. Lawrence Leo Graner became the first archbishop of the newly formed metropolitan see. 

Six men have been Archbishop of Dhaka; another Five were bishop of its predecessor diocese. One of them was elevated to the College of Cardinals. Theotonius Amal Ganguly, the eleventh ordinary of the archdiocese, was the first archbishop to be born in the Bangladesh, as well as the first born in Dhaka. Patrick D’Rozario became the first cardinal from Bangladesh in 2016. Michael Rozario had the longest tenure as Archbishop of Dhaka, serving for 28 years from 1977 to 2005, while Louage held the position for 42 months (1890–1894), marking the shortest episcopacy.

List of ordinaries

Apostolic Vicars

Bishops

Archbishops

Notes

References
General

 
 
 
 SpecificBibliography

 

Christianity in Dhaka
Dhaka
Dhaka-related lists